Adorni is an Italian surname. Notable people with the surname include:

Agustin Adorni (born 1990), Argentine footballer
Blessed Anna Maria Adorni Botti (1805–1893), was an Italian Roman Catholic widow
Davide Adorni (born 1992), Italian footballer
Lorenzo Adorni (born 1998), Italian footballer 
Vittorio Adorni (born 1937), Italian cyclist

Italian-language surnames